Mount Fillmore is a mountain in the Plumas National Forest in Sierra County, California.

Mount Fillmore was named for a naval officer.

References

Mountains of the Sierra Nevada (United States)
Mountains of Sierra County, California
Plumas National Forest
Mountains of Northern California